Samvel (or Samuel) Gezalian (born 12 September 1970) is an Armenian former competitive ice dancer who represented the Soviet Union, Belarus, and Armenia in international competition. With Tatiana Navka, he is the 1991 Skate America and Nations Cup champion and placed 11th at the 1994 Winter Olympics for Belarus. With Ksenia Smetanenko, he is the 1997 Golden Spin of Zagreb champion and competed at the 1998 Winter Olympics for Armenia.

Career

Early years in skating 
Gezalian began learning ice dancing at age ten in Odessa, where he was coached by Svetlana Rubleva and Boris Rublev. He later moved to Moscow. By 1985, he was skating with Maria Anikanova, coached by Tatiana Tarasova. In 1988, the duo joined Natalia Dubova's group following Tarasova's decision to stop coaching.

Partnership with Navka 
After Anikanova ended her competitive career, Gezalian teamed up with Tatiana Navka. Representing the Soviet Union, Navka/Gezalian won gold at the 1991 Skate America and 1991 Nations Cup. Following the Soviet Union's dissolution, Navka/Gezalian chose to skate for Belarus. They placed ninth in their debut at the European and World Championships, in 1993.

In the 1993–94 season, Navka/Gezalian won silver at the 1993 Skate Canada International and placed fourth at the 1993 NHK Trophy. They competed at the 1994 Winter Olympics in Lillehammer, placing 11th, before achieving their career-best Worlds result, fifth at the 1994 World Championships in Chiba, Japan.

In 1994–95, Navka/Gezalian won silver at the 1994 NHK Trophy and went on to achieve their best European result, fourth, at the 1995 European Championships in Dortmund. Their partnership came to an end following the 1995 World Championships where they placed seventh.

Partnerships with Goolsbee and Smetanenko 
Gezalian then teamed up with American-born Jennifer Goolsbee to represent Germany. They won the 1997 German Figure Skating Championships. Their partnership soon ended due to Goolsbee's citizenship problems.

Later in 1997, Gezalian teamed up with Ksenia Smetanenko to compete for his native Armenia. Placing sixth at the 1997 Karl Schäfer Memorial, they qualified a spot for Armenia at the Olympics. Smetanenko/Gezalian then won gold at the 1997 Golden Spin of Zagreb and placed 20th at the 1998 European Championships before competing at the 1998 Winter Olympics in Nagano, where they placed 24th. They retired from competition at the end of the season.

Post-competitive career 
Gezalian works as a skating coach in New York City.

Results

With Smetanenko for Armenia

With Goolsbee for Germany

With Navka for Belarus and the Soviet Union

References 

 Skatabase: 1990s Europeans
 Skatabase: 1990s Worlds
 Skatabase: 1990s Olympics

Living people
Armenian male ice dancers
Belarusian male ice dancers
Soviet male ice dancers
Olympic figure skaters of Belarus
Olympic figure skaters of Armenia
Figure skaters at the 1994 Winter Olympics
Figure skaters at the 1998 Winter Olympics
Sportspeople from Yerevan
1970 births